Boompa may refer to:

 Boompa Records, a Canadian music business
 Boompa, Queensland, a locality in the Fraser Coast Region, Queensland, Australia